Protungulatum ('first ungulate') is a extinct genus of pan-euungulate mammals within extinct family Protungulatidae, and also one of the earliest known placental mammals in the fossil record, that lived in North America from the Late Cretaceous to early Paleocene.

Fossils of this genus were first found in the Bug Creek Anthills in northeastern Montana. The Bug Creek Anthills were initially believed to be Late Cretaceous (latest Maastrichtian) because of the presence of the remains of non-avian dinosaurs and common Cretaceous mammals, but these were later shown to have been reworked from Late Cretaceous strata, and consequently the Bug Creek Anthills are currently believed to be Early Paleocene (Puercan) in age. Remains from the Ravenscrag Formation of Saskatchewan, Canada have been assigned to Protungulatum donnae. These remains may also be Cretaceous in age, but the age of the Ravenscrag Formation is not entirely certain. In 2011, remains of a new species in this genus, Protungulatum coombsi  from the Hell Creek Formation (which is definitely Maastrichtian) in age, proved that Protungulatum was present in both the Cretaceous and the Paleocene.

This genus was initially assigned to the order Condylarthra, a group of archaic "ungulates", that is now known to be polyphyletic. Later, it was assigned to the family Arctocyonidae. Studies differ on the placement of Protungulatum. Some found that it is not a true placental mammal and it is eutherian found to be close to Placentalia. Other studies consider it to be a placental mammal and stem relative to true ungulates.

Phylogeny 
The phylogenetic relationships of genus Protungulatum are shown in the following cladogram.

Notes

References

Prehistoric eutherians
†
Cretaceous mammals
Paleocene mammals
Hell Creek fauna
Prehistoric mammals of North America
Fossil taxa described in 1965
Prehistoric mammal genera